Æthelburg (also Æthelburh or Ethelburga) (ca. 673–740) was Queen of Wessex by marriage to King Ine of Wessex. Perhaps most famed for her act in 722, when she destroyed the stronghold of Taunton (which had been built by Ine) in an attempt to find the rebel Ealdbert.

Life

Æthelburg was born circa 673. She was the wife of King Ine of Wessex. Æthelburg is considered by some historians to be one of the few Anglo-Saxon women warriors. In 722, Æthelburg burned down the city of Taunton, a city built by Ine. Æthelburg's exact motivations for burning down the city are not clear, but she was either trying to find the rebel Ealdbert or she was trying to prevent Taunton from being taken by the rebels. In 726 Æthelburg went on a pilgrimage to Rome with her husband King Ine of Wessex who had abdicated the throne, he left no clear heir. Both Æthelburg and King Ine died in Rome.

Legacy
Æthelburg is a featured figure on Judy Chicago's installation piece The Dinner Party, being represented as one of the 999 names on the Heritage Floor.
In The Dinner Party the character Æthelburg is actually a combination of Æthelburg of Wessex and Æthelburg of Kent, which she is often confused with.

See also
House of Wessex family tree

References

Bibliography
Chicago, Judy. The Dinner Party: From Creation to Preservation''. London: Merrell (2007).

External links
 

8th-century English people
Anglo-Saxon royal consorts
Women in medieval European warfare
Year of birth unknown
Place of birth unknown
Year of death unknown
Place of death unknown
History of Taunton
House of Wessex
8th-century English women